Patrick Cronin (1921 - 21 February 1991) was an Irish Gaelic footballer who played for club sides Béal Átha'n Ghaorthaidh and Fermoy, and at inter-county level with the Cork senior football team. He usually lined out as a right wing-back.

Career

Cronin first came to Gaelic football prominence as a student when he was selected for the Munster colleges' team. He was included on the Cork minor team in 1938 before winning a Munster Minor Championship the following year. Cronin was added to the Cork senior team in 1943 and ended the season with a Munster Championship title. After being dropped from the starting fifteen the following year, he won his second provincial medal tin 1945 before ending the season by lining out at right wing-back when Cork claimed the All-Ireland title after a defeat of Cavan in the final. Cronin ended the year by captaining his adopted club of Fermoy to the County Championship title. He won a Railway Cup medal with Munster in 1946, however, a spinal injury soon brought his inter-county career to an end.

Personal life and death

Cronin qualified as a national school teacher and worked in Fermoy and Bartlemy before settling in Dublin. He died at his home in Walkinstown on 21 February 1991 after a period of ill health.

Honours

Fermoy
Cork Senior Football Championship: 1945 (c)

Cork
All-Ireland Senior Football Championship: 1945
Munster Senior Football Championship: 1943, 1945
Munster Minor Football Championship: 1939

Munster
Railway Cup: 1946

References

1921 births
1991 deaths
Fermoy Gaelic footballers
Cork inter-county Gaelic footballers
Munster inter-provincial Gaelic footballers
Winners of one All-Ireland medal (Gaelic football)